The Borgward BX5 is a Sino-German subcompact luxury crossover SUV from the Borgward Group and produced in China by Foton Motor. A fastback version called the Borgward BX6 was later launched.

Overview 

The world premiere of the Borgward BX5 was at the 2016 Geneva Motor Show. Like the larger BX7, the BX5 is initially produced for the Chinese market. The market launch took place on 24 March 2017.

Powertrain 
As standard, the BX5 has a 6-speed automatic transmission and front-wheel drive, optional four-wheel drive is available. In Germany, the BX5 is unlike initially thought to be sold exclusively with an electric motor.

Specifications

Awards 
Like the larger BX7, the BX5 and the BX6 TS 2016 received the "German Design Award".

References

BX5
Cars of China
Cars introduced in 2016